is a passenger railway station located in the city of Maniwa, Okayama Prefecture, Japan, operated by West Japan Railway Company (JR West).

Lines

Station layout
The station consists of two opposed ground-level side platforms connected by a footbridge. The station is unattended.

Platforms

Adjacent stations

History
Kuse Station opened on May 1, 1924. With the privatization of the Japan National Railways (JNR) on April 1, 1987, the station came under the aegis of the West Japan Railway Company.

Passenger statistics
In fiscal 2019, the station was used by an average of 187 passengers daily.

Surrounding area
Maniwa City Hall Main Office
Okayama Prefectural Maniwa High School Kuze Campus

See also
List of railway stations in Japan

References

External links

 Kuse Station Official Site

Railway stations in Okayama Prefecture
Kishin Line
Railway stations in Japan opened in 1925
Maniwa